The women's floorball tournament at the 2015 Southeast Asian Games was held at the ITE (Central), Singapore from 11 to 14 June 2015. The competition was held in a round-robin format, after which the top 2 teams at the end of the competition played in the gold medal match.

Squads

Results
All times are Singapore Standard Time (UTC+08:00)

Preliminaries

Gold medal match

Final standing

See also
Men's tournament

References

External links

 

Women
Women's sports competitions in Singapore